Kim is a 1950 adventure film made in Technicolor by Metro-Goldwyn-Mayer. It was directed by Victor Saville and produced by Leon Gordon from a screenplay by Helen Deutsch, Leon Gordon and Richard Schayer, based on the classic 1901 novel of the same name by Rudyard Kipling.

The film starred Errol Flynn, Dean Stockwell, and Paul Lukas. The music score was by André Previn. The film was shot on location in Rajasthan and Uttar Pradesh, India,  with some parts being in present-day Uttarakhand, as well as the Alabama Hills near Lone Pine, California, due to its resemblance to the Khyber Pass. Of particular interest is the location filming at La Martiniere College in Lucknow.

The film is set within the Great Game, a political and diplomatic confrontation between the British Empire and the Russian Empire. In the film, an orphan boy is trained as a spy by agents of the British Raj, and tasked with maintaining surveillance of two Russian spies.

Plot
Kim, an orphan boy in 1885 India during the British Raj, occasionally works for his friend Mahbub Ali, a roguish horse trader who is also a secret agent for the British. Mahbub Ali becomes aware of a Russian-backed plot to instigate a rebellion.

Meanwhile, Kim encounters an elderly Buddhist lama from Tibet, who is on a quest to find the "River of the Arrow", whose waters will cleanse him spiritually. Mahbub Ali has the young boy become the kindly priest's "chela" or disciple so that he can deliver a message to Colonel Creighton, Mahbub Ali's superior. On the journey along the Grand Trunk Road, the two travelers grow to love each other.

One day, British soldiers set up camp. Kim notices that their regimental flag depicts a red bull on a green field, which matches a prophecy left him by his now-deceased father, so he sneaks into the encampment and is accosted by a sentry. During a scuffle, his captors discover documents Kim possesses which show that he is actually the son of Kimball O'Hara, an Irish soldier who had served in the regiment. The lama decides that Kim should live among his own kind to be educated (despite the boy's resistance) and pays for his tuition at the finest boarding school in India. The boy chafes at the school's many restrictions, but eventually settles down.

Mahbub Ali convinces Colonel Creighton that the boy has the potential to become a wonderful spy; to that end, Kim receives extra training from the shopkeeper Lurgan during the first part of his summer vacation.

While traveling in disguise, Kim overhears a plot to assassinate Mahbub Ali and warns him, saving his life. He is then reunited with his lama and sent to help Hurree Chunder keep an eye on two Russian spies posing as surveyors. When he finds Chunder murdered, Kim talks the Russians into hiring him as their servant. He is eventually unmasked and the lama is beaten up. When news of Chunder's death reaches the British, Mahbub Ali is sent to take his place. He rescues Kim and takes charge of the interlopers' papers, but when a Russian expeditionary force approaches, the spies attempt to overpower him and he is forced to kill them; then he and Kim start a rockslide which buries the Russian force. In the end, the injured lama has a vision of his river, stumbles to it, and dies, contented. Kim and Mahbub Ali ride off together.

Cast
 Errol Flynn as Mahbub Ali, the Red Beard
 Dean Stockwell as Kim
 Paul Lukas as Lama
 Robert Douglas as Colonel Creighton
 Thomas Gomez as Emissary
 Cecil Kellaway as Hurree Chunder
 Arnold Moss as Lurgan Sahib
 Reginald Owen as Father Victor
 Laurette Luez as Laluli  
 Richard Hale as Hassan Bey  
 Roman Toporow as The Russian  
 Ivan Triesault as The other Russian

Production

Earlier proposed versions
MGM originally announced the film in 1938 as a vehicle for Freddie Bartholomew and Robert Taylor but World War II saw this put on hold.

In 1942 it was reactivated to star Mickey Rooney, Conrad Veidt (as Red Lama) and Basil Rathbone, from a script by Leon Gordon and produced by Victor Saville. However this was postponed out of fear of offending Indians and also war-time allies the Russians, who were the villains.

Development
In 1948 the Indian government approved the film and the Cold War meant it was permissible to have Russian villains. In January 1949 the project was reactivated as a vehicle for MGM's child star Dean Stockwell. Errol Flynn was signed in September.

Paul Lukas and Flynn went to India but all scenes involving Dean Stockwell were shot in Hollywood. Flynn left for India in November after attending a Royal screening of That Forsyte Woman in London.

Shooting
Locations used in the film included La Martiniere Lucknow (depicted as St. Xavier's College) in Lucknow, the horse market at the Kashmir Gates, Sirala, and the Himalayan foothills and the Khyber Pass. Doubles were used for Dean Stockwell and the characters of Huree Babu, Creighton Sahib and Lurgan Sahib (these hadn't been cast at the time of filming).

The unit returned to MGM in January 1950 to shoot the rest of the movie on the backlot.

Trivia
The musical leitmotif is the march D'Ye Ken John Peel, especially in scenes depicting the Presidency armies as predecessors of the British Indian army.

Reception

Box office
The movie was successful at the box office: according to MGM records the movie earned $2,896,000 in the US and Canada and $2,465,000 overseas, making it one of the studio's most popular films of the year. It was one of the most popular films at the French box office in 1951, with admissions of 2,514,860. According to Filmink magazine this was "the biggest gross of any Flynn movie during its initial release (not counting for inflation). Clearly in the right role and the right movie he remained a potent box office draw. "

It made an overall profit of $1,064,000.

Radio adaptation
Kim was presented on Lux Radio Theatre on February 18, 1952. The one-hour adaptation featured Errol Flynn and Dean Stockwell in their roles from the film.

References

External links
 
 
 
 

1950 films
1950s adventure drama films
1950s historical adventure films
1950s spy films
American historical adventure films
American adventure drama films
1950s English-language films
Films based on British novels
Films based on works by Rudyard Kipling
Films about the Great Game
Films set in 1885
Films set in India
Films set in the British Raj
Films shot in California
Films shot in Rajasthan
Films shot in Uttar Pradesh
Metro-Goldwyn-Mayer films
Films directed by Victor Saville
Films scored by André Previn
Films shot in Lucknow
Films set in Lucknow
1950 drama films
1950s American films
Films with screenplays by Richard Schayer
Films about orphans
American spy films